"Are You Gonna Be My Girl" is a song by Australian rock band Jet from their 2003 debut album, Get Born. It was released as the first single from the album on 18 August 2003 in the United States and on 1 September 2003 in Australia.

The song peaked at number 20 in Australia and reached the top 20 in Canada, Ireland, New Zealand, and the United Kingdom. In the United States, it reached number 29 on the Billboard Hot 100, making it their first top-40 hit and their highest charting single; it also peaked at number three on the Billboard Modern Rock Tracks chart and number seven on the Billboard Mainstream Rock Tracks chart. The single has sold 1.3 million copies in the United States since 2012.

In January 2018, as part of Triple M's "Ozzest 100", the 'most Australian' songs of all time, "Are You Gonna Be My Girl" was ranked number 38.

Structure
Written by Nic Cester and Cameron Muncey, the song is often cited for similarities to Iggy Pop's "Lust for Life" (particularly its drum pattern and near-identical guitar riff). The band, however, argues that "Are You Gonna Be My Girl" has more in common with 1960s Motown songs, namely "I'm Ready for Love" by Martha and the Vandellas and "You Can't Hurry Love" by the Supremes. Nic Cester said he was influenced by the stop-start structure of "My Generation" by the Who, as well as singers like Mick Jagger and Van Morrison who could "speak" verses and choose lyrics based on diction rather than poetry. 

Chris Cester responded to media commentary regarding the similarities, stating in a Jared Story interview that the beat was taken from Motown, referring to a meeting between Pop and himself:

Background

Nic Cester said he used to live in a bungalow with only two rooms, a bedroom and a toilet, so he would often sit on the toilet, lid down, and play around on his guitar. "Are You Gonna Be My Girl" originated there. He wrote it sometime between the ages of 17-19, when one of his main life goals was "trying, unsuccessfully, to shag as many girls as possible!" He wrote this song while frustrated about one girl, and the original hook was "She's just like every other girl", but his bandmates thought it was too negative and convinced him to make it more positive. The cough was an accident in the demo, but the producers thought it should be in the final mix. Nic refused to fake the cough, so they copied it from the demo and put it in the final mix.

Music video
The music video is shot in black and white, and shows Jet performing in a blank studio. As they play, black ink starts pouring out of their equipment and forms a landscape resembling the cover art on their album Get Born, the Beatles album Revolver and silhouettes of dancing girls. The video was shot at Vinopolis, London. Cameron Muncey can be seen wearing an AC/DC shirt.

Awards and nominations

APRA Awards
The APRA Awards are presented annually from 1982 by the Australasian Performing Right Association (APRA).

|+ APRA Awards for "Are You Gonna Be My Girl"
| 2004 || rowspan="4" | "Are You Gonna Be My Girl" || Song of the Year || 
|-
| 2005 || Most Performed Australian Work Overseas || 
|-
| 2006 || Most Performed Australian Work Overseas || 
|-
| 2007 || Most Performed Australian Work Overseas || 
|}

MTV Video Music Awards

|+ VMA Awards for "Are You Gonna Be My Girl"
| rowspan="3" | 2004 || rowspan="3" | "Are You Gonna Be My Girl" || Best New Artist || 
|-
| Best Rock Video || 
|-
| Best Editing || 
|}

Track listings

Australian CD single
 "Are You Gonna Be My Girl"
 "Last Chance"
 "Hey Kids"
 "You Were Right" (demo)

Australian 12-inch single
A1. "Are You Gonna Be My Girl"
B1. "Hey Kids"
B2. "That's Alright Mama" (live)

UK CD1
 "Are You Gonna Be My Girl"
 "Hey Kids"
 "You Were Right" (demo)
 "Are You Gonna Be My Girl" (video)

UK CD2
 "Are You Gonna Be My Girl" (alternative version)
 "That's Alright Mama" (live)
 "Take It or Leave It" (video)

UK DVD single
 "Are You Gonna Be My Girl" (video)
 "Rollover DJ" (video)
 "Are You Gonna Be My Girl" (audio)
 "Ain't That a Lotta Love" (audio)

European CD single
 "Are You Gonna Be My Girl"
 "Cigarettes & Cola"

Personnel
 Nic Cester – lead vocals, guitar
 Chris Cester – drums, tambourine, backing vocals
 Cameron Muncey – lead guitar, backing vocals
 Mark Wilson – bass guitar

Charts

Weekly charts

Year-end charts

Certifications

Release history

References

2003 debut singles
2003 songs
APRA Award winners
ARIA Award-winning songs
Capitol Records singles
Elektra Records singles
Jet (band) songs
Song recordings produced by Dave Sardy
Songs written by Cameron Muncey
Songs written by Nic Cester